North Lyndon Schoolhouse is a historic one-room school building located at Lyndon in Cattaraugus County, New York. It was built in 1844, and functioned as a local school until 1948.

It was listed on the National Register of Historic Places in 2000.

References

School buildings on the National Register of Historic Places in New York (state)
School buildings completed in 1844
One-room schoolhouses in New York (state)
Schoolhouses in the United States
Buildings and structures in Cattaraugus County, New York
National Register of Historic Places in Cattaraugus County, New York